John Solon (March 11, 1842June 23, 1921) was an Irish American immigrant, farmer, and Democratic politician.  He was a member of the Wisconsin State Assembly, representing southern Dodge County during the 1872 session.

Biography

Solon was born on March 11, 1842, in County Mayo, Ireland.  As a child, he emigrated to the United States with his parents and, in 1847, settled in the town of Shields, Dodge County, Wisconsin, where he was raised and educated. In 1862, he had been appointed Town Treasurer of Shields to fill the vacancy caused by the death of his father. Solon was elected to the position the following year. Other positions he held include town chairman (similar to Mayor) of Shields from 1869 to 1870.  Solon died at his home in Juneau, Wisconsin, on June 23, 1921.

References

19th-century Irish people
Farmers from Wisconsin
Politicians from County Mayo
Irish emigrants to the United States (before 1923)
People from Dodge County, Wisconsin
Mayors of places in Wisconsin
City and town treasurers in the United States
1842 births
1921 deaths
People from Juneau, Wisconsin
19th-century American politicians
Democratic Party members of the Wisconsin State Assembly